{{DISPLAYTITLE:C15H20O4}} 
The molecular formula C15H20O4 may refer to:

 Abscisic acid, a plant hormone
 DCW234, a synthetic nonsteroidal estrogen and a selective agonist of the ERβ
 Santonic acid, an organic compound containing both carboxylic acid and ketone functionality